Dehu (also Romanized as Dehū) is a village in Tiab Rural District, in the Central District of Minab County, Hormozgan Province, Iran. At the 2006 census, its population was 3,269, in 665 families.

References 

Populated places in Minab County